Lissocampus bannwarthi is a species of marine pipefish belonging to the family Syngnathidae. 

They are found in the coastal waters of the northern Red Sea in sandy substrates from depths of 0 to 3 meters. Their primary food source likely consists of small crustaceans and amphipods. Reproduction occurs through ovoviviparity, in which the males carry eggs in a brood pouch underneath their tail before giving birth to live offspring.

References

External links
Lissocampus bannwarthi at Fishbase

Syngnathidae
Fish described in 1915